Thomas Barton Boyd (born November 24, 1959) is a former linebacker in the National Football League. Boyd was drafted by the Green Bay Packers in the eighth round of the 1982 NFL Draft. He later played with the Detroit Lions during the 1987 NFL season.

College years 
Boyd attended the University of Alabama from 1978 to 1981.  He was an All-American in 1980 and 1981.  During his time at Alabama, the Crimson Tide won back to back National titles in 1978 and 1979.

References

External links
Just Sports Stats

Sportspeople from Huntsville, Alabama
Detroit Lions players
Detroit Drive players
Birmingham Stallions players
Saskatchewan Roughriders players
American football linebackers
Canadian football linebackers
American players of Canadian football
Alabama Crimson Tide football players
1959 births
Living people
National Football League replacement players